Cantonese seafood soup is one of the main seafood soups within Cantonese cuisine. It is commonly found in Hong Kong, and is also available in Chinatowns in other nations. The soup is usually considered midrange to high-end in price depending on the ingredients.

Description
The soup is generally thick with a very smooth texture, due to the use of starch as a thickening agent. It is usually whitish in color and a little transparent. The name of the dish describes it as a "gung" rather than the standard Chinese term for soup (tang, 汤); this reflects its southern Chinese origin.

Variety
 Plain Cantonese seafood soup
 Hundred flower Cantonese seafood soup
 Bamboo fungus Cantonese seafood soup
 Crab meat Cantonese seafood soup

See also
 Miso soup
 Egg drop soup
 List of Chinese soups
 List of soups

Chinese soups
Cantonese cuisine
Fish and seafood soups